Northern Kentucky University has had many noted alumni and faculty during its history. Some of those have gained national and international recognition as scientists, entertainers, politicians, and artists.

Notable alumni

 J. Warren Bettis, jurist who serves as a judge on the Ohio Court of Claims, earned his law degree from the Chase College of Law in 1952.
 Rich Boehne, president and CEO of the E.W. Scripps Company, the Cincinnati-based media company, graduated in 1981.
 Steve Chabot, U.S. Representative from Ohio's 1st Congressional District, earned his Juris Doctor from the Salmon P. Chase College of Law in 1978.
 Hollywood actor George Clooney studied broadcast journalism at NKU.
Joe Cunningham, former member of the U.S. House of Representatives from South Carolina's 1st district.
Corey Foister, 2016 Democratic candidate for Ohio's 8th Congressional District.
 Actor Adam Gregory from television and film: 90210, Hannah Montana: The Movie, and The Bold and the Beautiful.
 Hollis Hammonds, artist and academic
 Wrestler "Wildcat" Chris Harris attended NKU for two years.
 Ken Lucas, former U.S. Representative from Kentucky's fourth congressional district from 1999 to 2005, received an honorary doctorate from NKU. Lucas was a founding regent at NKU, where he served for 23 years on the Board of Regents, 13 of those as chairman. Lucas donated his congressional papers to the Schlachter Family Archives in NKU's Steely Library. In 1994 the Lucas Administrative Center on campus was named after him.
 Tom Luken, former mayor of Cincinnati, U.S. Representative from Ohio, and father of former Cincinnati mayor Charlie Luken, earned his Juris Doctor from the Salmon P. Chase College of Law in 1950.
 David Mack, creator of the comic book Kabuki and former writer/artist of Daredevil, graduated from NKU in 1995 with a BFA in graphic design.
 Savannah Maddox, current member of the Kentucky House of Representatives from the 61st district
 Brian Pillman Jr., professional wrestler known for his work in Major League Wrestling and All Elite Wrestling
 Galadriel Stineman, actress best known for her role as Cassidy in The Middle
 Jeff Walz, current head women's basketball coach at the University of Louisville.
 Gary Webb, Pulitzer Prize-winning journalist, was on staff of the student newspaper, The Northerner, before dropping out and joining The Kentucky Post. He later worked at the San Jose Mercury News, where his series, "Dark Alliance," alleged that the U.S.-supported Contra rebels in Nicaragua sold drugs in America and were largely responsible for introducing crack-cocaine into the U.S.

Notable faculty

 Hazel Barton, cave-exploring microbiology professor who has appeared on national and international press, TV and film. She was at Northern Kentucky University, but now is at the University of Akron. 
 Stephen Leigh, novelist, lecturer at NKU.
 Sharlotte Neely, anthropologist, author, expert on the Cherokees, and professor emerita at NKU.
 Sergei Polusmiak, Ukrainian concert pianist and master teacher, was artist in residence and professor in the music department from 1998 to 2012.
 Robert Trundle, former philosophy professor who Fate Magazine named as one of the 100 most influential people in Ufology in 2005 based on his book Is E.T. Here? and an article published in Science and Method in the Netherlands

References

External links
 Northern Kentucky University
 Northern Kentucky Norse Athletics

 
Northern Kentucky University alumni